Woden is a  mountain summit located within Olympic National Park in Jefferson County of Washington state. Its nearest higher neighbor is Mount Tom,  to the north-northwest, and Mount Olympus rises  to the north-northeast. Woden is the highest point in The Valhallas, a sub-range south of Mount Olympus. Precipitation runoff from the mountain drains into tributaries of the South Fork Hoh River and Queets River. The Geri-Freki Glacier, which descends north from Woden. is the only glacier in The Valhallas.

History

These peaks were originally named "Pleiades Peaks" by Robert L. Wood, a reference to the seven daughters of Atlas in Greek mythology, however this name did not stick. Glenn Kelsey and Harold Pinsch climbed in this area in 1970 and are credited with the Valhallas name. In Norse mythology, "Valhalla" is a great hall located in Asgard, ruled over by the god Odin, who in Old English was known as "Woden". The peak, Woden, may have originally been named "Mount O'Neil" by the 1890 Seattle Press Expedition in honor of Lt. Joseph O'Neil, who led an earlier 1885 exploration into the Olympic wilderness. The first ascent of Woden was made in 1966 by Ernie Labistida and Ivan Lindgren.

Climate
Based on the Köppen climate classification, The Valhallas are located in the marine west coast climate zone of western North America. Most weather fronts originate in the Pacific Ocean, and travel northeast toward the Olympic Mountains. As fronts approach, they are forced upward by the peaks of the Olympic Range, causing them to drop their moisture in the form of rain or snowfall (Orographic lift). As a result, the Olympics experience high precipitation, especially during the winter months. During winter months, weather is usually cloudy, but due to high pressure systems over the Pacific Ocean that intensify during summer months, there is often little or no cloud cover during the summer. The months July through September offer the most favorable weather for viewing or climbing these peaks.

Geology
The Olympic Mountains are composed of obducted clastic wedge material and oceanic crust, primarily Eocene sandstone, turbidite, and basaltic oceanic crust. The mountains were sculpted during the Pleistocene era by erosion and glaciers advancing and retreating multiple times.

Summits
Select named peaks of The Valhalla Range All are named after Norse gods, except Sleipner (Odin's horse) and Pelton.

Gallery

See also

 Geology of the Pacific Northwest

References

External links
 
 Weather forecast: National Weather Service

Olympic Mountains
Mountains of Washington (state)
Mountains of Jefferson County, Washington
Landforms of Olympic National Park